The 2014 VFF National Super League was the Vanuatu qualifying competition for the 2014–15 OFC Champions League.

The competition was won by the Port Vila club, Tafea FC.

Teams
18 teams will qualify from 8 separate national competitions.

Matches

Group stage 
From Group A, Spirit 11 FC advanced in first place and Torba United FC advanced in second place.

From Group B, Malampa Revivors FC advanced in first place and Tutuba FC advanced in second place.

From Group C, Tafea F.C. advanced in first place and Amicale F.C. advanced in second place.

From Group D, Spirit 08 F.C. advanced in first place and Malnaruru FC advanced in second place.

Playoffs

Quarter-finals

Semi-finals

Grand final

References

2013–14 in Vanuatuan football
VFF National Super League seasons